Mera Pehla Pyar is a Pakistani television drama series aired on ARY Digital. It is written by Syed Zain Raza and Jewairia Hafeez, directed by Sohail Javed, and produced by Asif Raza Mir and Babar Javed. It stars Faysal Quraishi, Shazia Naz and Sana Javed.

Plot
Hamid and Amna have arrived from Islamabad to visit their son Taha, his wife Aisha and their nine-year-old daughter Hira. Amna notices the consistent absence of Aisha from the house and it is obvious to her that her granddaughter is being neglected. Taha has been married upon his strict, yet loving mother's wishes to her niece, Aisha who is struggling to balance her career as a model and is over wrought by her work commitments. Taha is a compassionate and compromising husband who understands his wife's commitment to her career and he tries his best to fulfill a balance between his job and the house and ends up playing the role of both the mother and father to their daughter. Taha's charm also extends at his workplace as his co-worker Zara is enthralled by his ability to manage his work and married life; however he makes it very clear to her that she is just a colleague to him. However, for Taha things are not going well in their marriage as Hira begins to feel insecure about her mother's love and neglect causing some full on confrontations between Taha and Aisha as they struggle to maintain a balance in their married life.

Cast

 Faysal Qureshi as Taha
 Nausheen Shah as Aisha
 Shazia Naz as Maira
 Sana Javed as Zaara
 Seemi Pasha as Zarva
 Laila Zuberi as Amna
 Shehryar Zaidi as Hamid
 Arisha Razi as Hira
 Aijaz Aslam as Irfan

Soundtrack

The show's theme song Naina Tere was composed by Shiraz Uppal and sung by Shiraz Uppal and Qurat-ul-Ain Balouch with lyrics by Sabir Zafar. The song plays in the last episode during Taha and Maira's wedding.

References

External links

2012 Pakistani television series debuts
2013 Pakistani television series endings
Pakistani drama television series
A&B Entertainment